Cayley Mercer (born January 18, 1994) is a Canadian women's ice hockey player. She most recently played with the Shenzhen KRS Vanke Rays of the Canadian Women's Hockey League (CWHL) in the 2018–19 season.

Mercer played with the Clarkson Golden Knights women's ice hockey program from 2013 to 2017 and was a Top-3 Finalist for the 2017 Patty Kazmaier Award. Her career at Clarkson saw her win two Division 1 National Championships with the Golden Knights, and she graduated as the program's all-time leader in career goals scored, and second all time in career points.

At the 2017 CWHL Draft, she was the first-ever player selected by the Vanke Rays, taken seventh overall. In the 2017–18 CWHL season, Mercer finished second in the CWHL with 41 points in 28 games, behind only Kelli Stack.

Awards and honours
Top-3 Finalist for the 2017 Patty Kazmaier Award
First Team All American 2017
USCHO Player of the Year 2017
USCHO First Team Honors 2017
Frozen Four Most Outstanding Player 2017
Frozen Four All Tournament Team 2017
ECAC Player of the Year 2017
ECAC Forward of the Year 2017
ECAC First Team All League 2017
ECAC All Tournament Team 2017
Clarkson University Female Athlete of the Year (2017)
Clarkson University Women's Hockey MVP (2015, 2016, 2017)
ECAC First Team All League 2016
ECAC First Team All League 2015
Most Sportsmanlike Player, 2011 Canadian U18 National Tournament

References

External links
 
 Cayley Mercer at Clarkson Golden Knights

1994 births
Living people
Canadian women's ice hockey forwards
Ice hockey people from Ontario
Clarkson Golden Knights women's ice hockey players
Vanke Rays players
Canadian expatriate ice hockey players in China